Holy Week in Cuenca (Semana Santa de Cuenca) is the most important religious event of Cuenca, Spain. It is celebrated in the week leading up to Easter (Holy Week among Christians). As a reflection of its cultural, historic and spiritual importance, Holy Week in Cuenca was declared Fiesta of International Tourist Interest of Spain.

The Pasos 
The Pasos are the core of the festival. They consist of a wooden sculpture or group of sculptures that narrates a scene from the Passion of Christ. Porters called Banceros carry them on a platform or staves.

The Processions 
Processions are the main event of Semana Santa in Cuenca. Every fraternity organizes its own procession. Generally, the processions move through the city center, from their home Church to the Cathedral and Plaza Mayor or surrounding areas. A few exceptions to the 'standard' routing make every parade unique.

Some of the most important Procession are:
 Procession of the Hosanna
 Procession of the Vera Cruz
 Procession of El Perdon
 Procession of El Silencio
 Procession of Paz y Caridad
 Procession of Camino del Calvario
 Procession of En el Calvario
 Procession of Santo Entierro
 Procession of ' ' El duelo  Procession of El Encuentro''

References

Catholic holy days
Holy Week processions
Province of Cuenca
Cuenca